Chorizopora is a genus of bryozoans belonging to the family Chorizoporidae.

The genus has almost cosmopolitan distribution.

Species

Species:

Chorizopora annulata 
Chorizopora atrox 
Chorizopora brogniartii 
Chorizopora brongniartii

References

Bryozoan genera